Damián Marcelo Musto (born 9 June 1987) is an Argentine footballer who plays as a midfielder for Spanish club FC Cartagena.

Club career

Early career
Born in Casilda, Musto joined Quilmes' youth setup in 2005, from hometown side Club Atlético Alumni. He made his senior debut during the 2006–07 season, suffering relegation from Primera División.

In 2008, Musto joined Primera B Nacional side Atlético Tucumán.  Midfielder with strong marking style comparable to that of Pablo Guiñazú. He featured regularly during his two-year spell at the club, achieving promotion to the first division in his first campaign.

On 13 July 2010 Musto signed for Lega Pro Prima Divisione club Spezia. After appearing sparingly, he returned to his home country after agreeing to a contract with Olimpo.

Rosario Central
On 29 July 2015, Musto was loaned to Rosario Central for 18 months, with a buyout clause. He made his debut for the club on 9 August, in a 3–1 win against former club Quilmes.

Tijuana
On 3 July 2017 Musto joined Tijuana on a 2 million dollar move for a three-years contract. Musto scoring his first goal with the club on August 25, 2017 scoring the late winner goal in the 87 min against C.F. Pachuca ending in a 2–1 win.

Huesca
On 14 July 2018 Musto was loaned to La Liga side SD Huesca for one season, with an obligatory buyout clause.

Internacional (loan)
On 30 December 2019, Musto joined Internacional on loan from Huesca until the end of the 2020 season.

References

External links

1987 births
Living people
People from Casilda
Argentine people of Italian descent
Argentine footballers
Association football midfielders
Argentine Primera División players
Primera Nacional players
Atlético Tucumán footballers
Quilmes Atlético Club footballers
Rosario Central footballers
Liga MX players
Club Tijuana footballers
La Liga players
SD Huesca footballers
FC Cartagena footballers
Sport Club Internacional players
Campeonato Brasileiro Série A players
Peñarol players
Uruguayan Primera División players
Argentine expatriate footballers
Argentine expatriate sportspeople in Mexico
Argentine expatriate sportspeople in Spain
Argentine expatriate sportspeople in Brazil
Argentine expatriate sportspeople in Uruguay
Expatriate footballers in Mexico
Expatriate footballers in Spain
Expatriate footballers in Brazil
Expatriate footballers in Uruguay
Sportspeople from Santa Fe Province